On 9 December 2012, a Learjet 25 business jet carrying five passengers including American singer Jenni Rivera crashed south of Monterrey, Mexico, minutes after taking off from the city's international airport. All aboard, including two crew members, were killed.
 
The subsequent investigation was unable to determine the cause of the sudden steep descent that led to the aircraft impacting the ground at extremely high speed.

Accident
The Learjet 25 was chartered to fly Rivera and four others from Monterrey to Toluca, near Mexico City, after she performed a concert at the Monterrey Arena. It took off from Monterrey International Airport at about 3:20am local time on 9 December 2012. Around 15 minutes later, while still climbing towards its assigned cruise level, the aircraft suddenly went into a steep descent and disappeared from radar, crashing to the ground. No distress call was received from the crew.

The wreckage was located later in the day near Iturbide, Nuevo León. The aircraft had completely disintegrated on impact. There were no survivors among the seven people on board.

Aircraft
The aircraft was a twin-engine Learjet 25 with US registration N345MC, built in 1969 with serial number 25-046. It was operated by Starwood Management LLC.

In 2005, N345MC was involved in an incident during which a fuel imbalance developed between the left and right wing's fuel tanks, although no technical fault was found within the fuel system. No one was injured.

Investigation 
The investigation into the accident was carried out by the Mexican Directorate General of Civil Aeronautics (DGAC). Since the United States was the state of manufacture and registry of the aircraft, the US National Transportation Safety Board (NTSB) sent an accredited representative to assist with the inquiry.

In December 2014, the DGAC issued its final accident report. The investigation was hampered by the fact that the flight data recorder was destroyed in the impact, and no information could be retrieved. The cockpit voice recorder was never found.

From the analysis of the recorded radar information, it was determined that the Learjet had experienced a sudden loss of control while climbing through , leading to a nearly vertical high-speed nosedive. The angle of impact with terrain was estimated at 89°, and the impact speed higher than the aircraft's maximum operating speed.

Other flight crews that had previously flown on N345MC had reported occurrences of anomalous vibrations felt on the control column during cruise, leading the investigators to speculate that the sudden nosedive might have been the result of a failure in the horizontal stabilizer, although no hard evidence was found among the badly damaged parts of the system recovered from the wreckage.

Furthermore, the NTSB, after conducting laboratory analysis on the stabilizer's actuator, found no evidence of pre-existing damage or failure, and later issued a comment on the DGAC's findings that there was "no factual data that supports [the hypothesis of a horizontal stabilizer failure]."

The report concluded that the probable cause of the accident was "loss of control of the aircraft for undetermined reasons." It was also established that the flight crew was in breach of local regulations regarding age limits and qualifications. The captain, 78, had exceeded the maximum age allowed for his role, while the co-pilot, 21, did not hold a valid type rating for the Learjet 25.

References

External links
Directorate General of Civil Aeronautics documents
 "Informes de Dictámenes" (Archive) 
 Errata (Archive) 
 "La DGAC da a conocer informe sobre accidente de aeronave en el Rancho "El Tejocote"" (Archive) – 3 December 2013. PDF version (Archive) 

National Transportation Safety Board documents:
 "ATTACHMENT 1 Bombardier Learjet 25 Service Manual Excerpt" (Archive)
 "Page from N345MC Airplane Maintenance Log Book Regarding Horizontal Stabilizer Actuator" (Archive)
 "Computed Tomography Specialist’s Factual Report" (Archive). DCA-12-RA-025. 13 March 2014.
 "Performance Study" (Archive).
 "Weather Study" (Archive) – 10 December 2012

2012 disasters in Mexico
21st century in Nuevo León
Accidents and incidents involving the Learjet 45 family
Aviation accidents and incidents in 2012
2012 Learjet 25 crash
Learjet 25 crash
Jenni Rivera